The 2019 Mongolian constitutional crisis refers to legislation that has been criticized as threatening Mongolia's democracy by undermining its constitutional separation of powers. Though there is no consensus on the exact date the crisis began, many point to 27 March 2019, when the Mongolian Parliament adopted an unprecedented law empowering the National Security Council of Mongolia to recommend the dismissal of judges, prosecutors, and the head of the Anti-Corruption Agency. Proposed by President Khaltmaagiin Battulga, the law was ratified by a majority of the ruling Mongolian People's Party.

Background

The Mongolian People's Party won the 2016 elections with a supermajority, claiming 65 of 76 total seats. In November 2018 Prime Minister Ukhnaagiin Khürelsükh survived a vote of no confidence in the wake of a 2018 scandal involving the fraudulent allocation of the Small and Medium Enterprises Development Fund. Empowered to dismiss the Speaker by a law proposed by President Battulga, Khürelsükh's supporters in Parliament eventually ousted Speaker of Parliament Miyeegombyn Enkhbold, replacing him with current Speaker Gombojavyn Zandanshatar. Khürelsükh promised to dissolve the cabalistic MANAN (a play on words between the Mongolian word for fog манан and the combined acronyms used by the two political parties involved) as part of a larger initiative to address corruption and restore justice. Khürelsükh received widespread public support for this on social media. At this point the judiciary was widely seen as the only remaining branch of government that posed a threat to Khürelsükh and President Battulga. Prosecutor General M.Enkh-Amgalan was a vocal critic of parliamentarians involved with the SME loan scandal.

Events

Shortly after the public apology in late March 2019 by Minister of Justice Tsendiin Nyamdorj for the torture of suspects indicted for the 1998 murder of Sanjaasürengiin Zorig, the National Security Council of Mongolia sent an urgent order dated 25 March 2019, to President Battulga. The National Security Council of Mongolia currently includes the President, Prime Minister, and Speaker of Parliament.

President Battulga proposed the law to Parliament on 26 March. The opposing Democratic Party criticized the law as an attempt to seize state authority by force. Many law professors, lawyers, and former members of parliament protested that the National Security Council is not a constitutional body and warned of the dangers of putting the judiciary in the hands of the legislature and executive branches, particularly the long-term consequences of depreciating the checks and balances that underlie the 1992 Mongolian constitution. Former President of Mongolia Tsakhiagiin Elbegdorj held a press conference criticizing the law.

On 27 March, Parliament convened to ratify the law, where they first viewed and discussed the classified footage of the torture of Sanjaasürengiin Zorig's alleged murderers before voting. Despite members of the Democratic Party leaving parliament hall and refusing to vote, the law was ratified by a significant majority. The following day, both the Chief Justice of the Supreme Court, Ts.Zorig, and Prosecutor General of Mongolia, M.Enkh-Amgalan, were dismissed by Presidential order. B.Amgalanbaatar, alleged to be involved with the SME loan scandal, took charge as Acting Prosecutor General.

The torture video was shown to journalists on 29 March 2019, who were then allowed to convey its contents to the general public through written descriptions and drawings.

Reactions

Amnesty International of Mongolia published an announcement on 28 March 2019, stating that the recently ratified law posed a serious threat to the independence of the judiciary branch and increased the risk of further illegal torture.

Prominent lawyers said they would appeal to the Constitutional Court of Mongolia. Foreign language news did not report on the events. Mongolian media reported heavily on the events and social media platforms were active with discussion. The only English language article related to the constitutional crisis was posted in  The UB Post.

The National Human Rights Commission of Mongolia complained that Parliament only now took note of torture despite previously being notified 13 times from the Commission regarding torture.

References

Mongolia
Politics of Mongolia
Political history of Mongolia
2019 in Mongolia